Timber Pines is a census-designated place (CDP) in Hernando County, Florida, United States. The population was 5,386 at the 2010 census.

Geography
Timber Pines is located in southwestern Hernando County at  (28.468625, -82.602006). It is bordered to the north, east, and south by Spring Hill and to the west by U.S. Route 19, which leads north  to Weeki Wachee and south  to Hudson.

Demographics

As of the census of 2000, there were 5,840 people, 3,229 households, and 2,408 families residing in the CDP. The racial makeup of the CDP was 98.94% White, 0.38% African American, 0.05% Native American, 0.27% Asian, 0.09% from other races, and 0.27% from two or more races. Hispanic or Latino of any race were 0.63% of the population.

There were 3,229 households, out of which 0.9% had children under the age of 18 living with them, 72.7% were married couples living together, 1.4% had a female householder with no husband present, and 25.4% were non-families. 23.3% of all households were made up of individuals, and 21.2% had someone living alone who was 65 years of age or older.  The average household size was 1.81 and the average family size was 2.05.

In the CDP, the population was spread out, with 1.0% under the age of 18, 0.5% from 18 to 24, 1.5% from 25 to 44, 18.5% from 45 to 64, and 78.4% who were 65 years of age or older.  The median age was 72 years. For every 100 females, there were 84.8 males.  For every 100 females age 18 and over, there were 84.3 males.

The median income for a household in the CDP was $43,666, and the median income for a family was $50,526. Males had a median income of $20,278 versus $50,078 for females. The per capita income for the CDP was $34,900.  About 1.5% of families and 2.6% of the population were below the poverty line, including 100.0% of those under age 18 and 1.4% of those age 65 or over.

References

Census-designated places in Hernando County, Florida
Census-designated places in Florida
Planned communities in Florida